Daeng Parani (died ca. 1726) was one of the five Bugis brothers from Luwu, Sulawesi, who established political dominance over the royal houses of Peninsular Malaysia. Daing Parani became personally embroiled in the politics of the Sultanates of Johor, Riau, Lingga and Pahang in the early 18th century.

Early life

Daeng Parani was the eldest among five sons of Daing Rilaka and Upu Tenribong; his four other brothers being Daeng Menambun, Daeng Marewah, Daeng Chelak and Daeng Kemasi. As a youth, Daing Parani was said to have hooked up with a concubine of the Raja of Bone, during which he killed a Macassar prince and hence forcing his entire family to resettle in Riau.

Involvement in Johor

Daeng Parani agreed to assist a Minangkabau prince, Raja Kecil, in overthrowing Johor and its Sultan Abdul Jalil IV, the Bendahara (viceroy) who had taken power after the death of Sultan Mahmud Shah II without an official heir.  Kecil claimed to be Mahmud's posthumous son. In 1717, however, Kecil attacked Riau without Daeng Parani, and claimed the throne. Abdul Jalil IV's son, Sulaiman Badrul Alam Shah, then sought the help of Daeng Parani and his Bugis warriors.  They joined with Sulaiman and defeated Kecil in 1722. Sulaiman installed Daeng Parani's brother, Daeng Merewah, as Yam Tuan Muda (crown prince); under this arrangement, the Bugis were the actual power behind the throne of Johor.

Daeng Parani was killed in about 1726 in Kedah. His descendants through Tun Abdul Jamal (a maternal grandson of Daeng Parani), son of Bendahara Tun Abbas, gradually became the rulers of Johor during the 19th century. Daing Parani married Tengku Tengah, a daughter of Sultan Abdul Jalil IV.

Family

Notes

References

 Ali, al-Haji Riau, Hooker, Virginia Matheson, Andaya, Barbara Watson, The Precious Gift: Tuhfat Al-nafis, Oxford University Press, 1982, 
 Bastin, John Sturgus, Winks, Robin W.,  Malaysia: Selected Historical Readings, KTO Press, 1979, 
 Carl A. Trocki, Prince of Pirates: The Temenggongs and the Development of Johor and Singapore, 1784-1885, Institute of Southeast Asian Studies, Singapore University Press, 1979
 Keat Gin Ooi, Southeast Asia: A Historical Encyclopedia, from Angkor Wat to East Timor, ABC-CLIO, 2004, 
 The Voice of Islam, Published by Jamiyat-ul-Falah., 1953
 Wilkinson, Richard James, Papers on Malay Subjects, Part I-V, BiblioBazaar, LLC, 2008,

External links
 "History", Embassy of Malaysia, Seoul
 Britannica Online entry

1726 deaths
History of Malaysia
House of Temenggong of Johor
Royal House of Selangor
Year of birth unknown